The Republican State Committee of Delaware is the affiliate of the United States Republican Party in Delaware. It has regional offices in Dover, Newark, North Wilmington, and Georgetown.

History of the party

Beginning
The Republican State Committee of Delaware got its start in the mid-19th century, when the American Party (a group dedicated to prohibition of alcohol), People's Party, and former Whigs reformed under the Union Party. This party was dedicated to preserve the Union in the time of Abraham Lincoln's election. While Delaware did not secede from the Union, Delaware Democrats and other supporters often opposed Lincoln's policies. The Republican party struggled to gain control in the state from 1865 to 1898, with the Democratic Party maintaining control of both the federal and state level of government. However, changes in industry and the arrival of immigrants in key locations would soon spell the rise of the Republican party in Delaware.

The RSC's first rise to prominence
With industry and business slowly overtaking agriculture in the state, the Republican Party in Delaware began to develop the support it needed to overthrow the long incumbent Democratic Party. However, the rise of the party was not complete without some controversial actions. As it was common in the era, the late 1800s was rife with voter corruption and illegal election techniques. One candidate, John Addicks, was infamous for attempting to buy a U.S. Senate seat by exploiting the rising party. Republicans in the state divided on the issue with Regular Republicans opposing Addicks while Union Republicans supported him. Although Addicks didn't win election in 1899 or 1901, his corrupt tactics led to a vacation of the U.S. Senate seat for over ten years.  However, Addick's corruption proved to be only a small speed bump. With industry as a growing part of the Delaware economy, the Republican Party began to grow in popularity. With men such as Henry Du pont and T. Colemon Du pont (Both members of the famous industrial Du pont family) leading the way, the Republican Party quickly gained power in the state and various government positions.  By 1915, Republicans controlled the Delaware Senate by a margin of 12 to 5 and the House by 23 to 10. Governors of the state remained Republican candidates from 1897 up until 1936. With the exception of ratifying the 19th Amendment on a state level (once the U.S. Constitution accepted it, then Delaware did as well), the Republican majority in both the federal and state level dominated legislation until the mid-1930s.

Trading time with the Democrats
Since World War II, the Republican Party of Delaware has had its time of prominence and powerlessness. Two Republicans, John Williams and J. Caleb Boggs, compromised two-thirds of the "Big Three" in Delaware politics. Williams would end up serving in the U.S. Senate from 1946 to 1971 while Boggs won seven statewide elections consisting of governor, U.S. House of Representatives, and U.S. Senate from 1947 to 1973.

From 1949 to 2008, the Republican Party has held the governorship for 29 years compared to the 30 years held by Democrats. Despite dominating the gubernatorial position from 1977 to 1993, all gubernatorial elections being won by Democrats since 1993.

Party leadership

State Chair: M. Jane Brady
Vice Chair: Rep Mike Ramone
Treasurer: Dennis Cini
Secretary: Julia Pillsbury
Executive Assistant: Paula Manolakos
College Republican Chair: Daniel Worthington
Delaware Federation of Republican Women Chair:
National Committeeman: Hank McCann
National Committeewoman:  Mary Mc Crossan

Current elected officials

Members of Congress

U.S. Senate
 None

Both of Delaware's U.S. Senate seats have been held by Democrats since 2000. William Roth was the last Republican to represent Delaware in the U.S. Senate. First elected in 1970, Roth lost his bid for a sixth term in 2000 to Tom Carper who has held the seat since.

U.S. House of Representatives
None

Delaware's lone congressional district has been held by Democrats since 2010. The last Republican to represent Delaware in the House of Representatives was Mike Castle. First elected in 1992, Castle opted not to run for re-election in 2010, instead unsuccessfully running for the Republican nomination for U.S. Senate. Glen Urquhart ran as the Republican nominee for the House seat in the 2010 election and was subsequently defeated by Democratic challenger John Carney.

Statewide offices
 None

Delaware has not elected any GOP candidates to statewide office since 2014, when Tom Wagner was re-elected as state auditor and Ken Simpler was elected as state treasurer.  In 2018, Wagner opted not to seek re-election to an eight term. In 2018 elections James Spadola ran as the Republican nominee for auditor and was subsequently defeated by Democratic challenger Kathy McGuiness while Simpler was defeated in his bid for a second term as treasurer by Democratic challenger Colleen Davis.

State legislative leaders
 Senate Minority Leader: Gerald Hocker
 House Minority Leader: Daniel Short

State Assembly

State Senators
In 2017, Republicans controlled ten State Senate seats. State Senators must be citizens of the United States and have resided in Delaware for three years. Candidates must also have been a resident of their respective district for at least one year preceding their election. The age requirement to run for this elected seat is 27 years old. In 2016 young millennial and civil attorney, Anthony Delcollo defeated long time 26-year incumbent, President Pro-Tempore  Patrica Blevins (D) by 206 votes and thinning the partisan margin in the Senate.

In 2018, Minority Whip Senator Greg Lavelle (R) lost his reelection bid to Senator Laura V. Sturgeon by a margin of 53% to 47%, widening the gap between Democrats and Republicans by an additional seat. Presently, Republicans have 9 seats in the Delaware State Senate to the Democrats' 12 seats.

Senator F. Gary Simpson, the Senate GOP's minority leader, retired before the 2018 elections. His seat was filled by Senator David Wilson.

5th Senate District: Cathy Cloutier
6th Senate District: Ernesto Lopez
7th Senate District: Anthony Delcollo 
15th Senate District: David G. Lawson
16th Senate District: Colin Bonini
18th Senate District: David Wilson
19th Senate District: Brian Pettyjohn
20th Senate District: Gerald Hocker
21st Senate District: Bryant Richardson

State Representatives
As of 2019, Republicans controlled 15 of the 41 State Assembly seats. Any candidate running for the House of Representatives must have lived in Delaware for three years and be a U.S. Citizen. The candidate must also live in the district at least one year prior to running for office and be at least 24 years of age.

9th Representative District: Kevin Hensley
11th Representative District: Jeffrey Spiegelman
20th Representative District: Stephen Smyk
21st Representative District: Mike Ramone
22nd Representative District: Mike Smith
30th Representative District: Bobby Outten
33rd Representative District: Harold Peterman
34th Representative District: Lyndon Yearick
35th Representative District: David Wilson
36th Representative District: Harvey R. Kenton
37th Representative District: Ruth Briggs King
38th Representative District: Ronald Gray
39th Representative District/Minority Leader: Danny Short
40th Representative District: Tim Dukes
41st Representative District: Richard Collins

Notable Delaware Republicans

Proud Blasian Woman: Amanda Johnson

See also
Delaware State Capitol
Delaware General Assembly
Delaware House of Representatives
Delaware Senate

References

External links
Republican State Committee of Delaware
 Republican National Committee — Official website

Political parties in Delaware
Delaware